Celestial being may refer to:

 A sky deity
 An angel
 Extraterrestrial life
 Celestial Being (Mobile Suit Gundam 00), a fictional paramilitary organization 
 "Celestial Being" (Mobile Suit Gundam 00 episode)